Greiz is a Kreis (district) in the east of Thuringia, Germany. Neighboring districts are (from the west clockwise) Saale-Holzland, Saale-Orla, district-free city Gera, the Burgenlandkreis in Saxony-Anhalt, Altenburger Land, and the two Saxon districts Zwickau and Vogtlandkreis.

History 
Historically the area of the district was part of the Vogtland, named after the title Vogt given to the local rulers in the 13th century. Only two lines of the Reuß family survived from that time, with one principality based in Greiz, and the other in Gera and Schleiz. In 1919 both were merged into the Volksstaat Reuß, which then became part of Thuringia in 1920.

A subcamp of the Buchenwald concentration camp was located at Berga/Elster during World War II. It was an SS joint venture, in which inmates dug tunnels and laid railway tracks for the Schwalbe V project.

The district in its current form was created on July 1, 1994, when the districts Gera-Land, Zeulenroda and the previous district Greiz were merged.

Geography 
In the south of the district are the mountains of the Thuringian Slate Mountains (Thüringer Schiefergebirge) and the Ore Mountains, with the river valley of the Weiße Elster going through the district from south to north.

Coat of arms 
Both the lion as well as the crane in the top part of the coat of arms derive from the coat of arms of the Reuß families and their principalities. In the bottom is a part of the coat of arms of Saxony, as a small part of the district belonged to the Duchies of Saxony.

Towns and municipalities

Sights
Sights in the district Greiz:
The Upper Castle of Greiz
The Lower Castle of Greiz
The Summer Palace Greiz
Weida Osterburg Castle
Ronneburg Castle
Reichenfels Castle Ruin
Old Guardhouse "Alte Wache" in Greiz
Zeulenroda Town Hall
Widen Church Ruin in Weida
St. Veit Parish Church
Mildenfurth Monastery
Cronschwitz Monastery Ruin
Greiz Park
Fairy Tale Forest in Wünschendorf

Museums in the district Greiz:
Museum of Local History in Greiz
Summer Palace in Greiz
Zeulenroda City Museum in Zeulenroda
Osterburg Castle Museum in Weida, Thuringia
Heinrich Schütz House in Bad Köstritz
Museum in Hohenleuben

References

External links
Official website